Murat Ceylan (born 2 March 1988) is a Turkish footballer who plays as a defensive midfielder for an amateur side Adana Sümer 01.

Life and career
Ceylan was born in Gaziantep, Turkey. He began his career with local club Gaziantep Büyükşehir Belediyespor in 2002, eventually moving to cross-town rivals Gaziantepspor in 2004. Ceylan made his debut that same season, against Akçaabat Sebatspor, playing two matches in total. However, he spent the majority of the season in the youth leagues, making 27 appearances. He was loaned half way through the 2005-06 season to another Gaziantep based club, Gaskispor. He returned to Gaziantespor at the start of the 2007-08 season. He was linked with Galatasaray at the end of the 2009-10 season, but a move never materialized.

On the last day of the January transfermarket 2019, Ceylan was one of 22 players on two hours, that signed for Turkish club Elazığspor. had been placed under a transfer embargo but managed to negotiate it with the Turkish FA, leading to them going on a mad spree of signing and registering a load of players despite not even having a permanent manager in place. In just two hours, they managed to snap up a record 22 players - 12 coming in on permanent contracts and a further 10 joining on loan deals until the end of the season.

International career
Ceylan was first called up to the Turkey U-17 squad in September 2004 for two matches against the Bulgaria U-17s, but was not capped. He earned his first cap for the U-17 squad in a match against Italy on 22 December 2004. He has been capped for the U-19 team and for the Turkey national under-21 football team.

Career statistics

Club

References

External links
 
 Guardian Stats Centre
 

1988 births
Sportspeople from Gaziantep
Living people
Turkish footballers
Turkey youth international footballers
Turkey under-21 international footballers
Turkey B international footballers
Association football midfielders
Gaziantepspor footballers
Gaskispor footballers
Samsunspor footballers
Mersin İdman Yurdu footballers
Gaziantep F.K. footballers
Fatih Karagümrük S.K. footballers
Elazığspor footballers
Süper Lig players
TFF First League players
TFF Second League players
TFF Third League players